Lee Fieldwick (born 6 September 1982) is an English retired former professional football left back who played in the Football League for Brentford and Swansea City. After his release from Brentford in 2004, he had a brief career in non-League football and later played amateur football.

Career

Brentford 
A left back, Fieldwick began his career in the youth system at Brentford and signed his first professional contract in 2001. Illness and injury prevented Fieldwick from progressing into the first team squad during the 2001–02 season and he had to wait until 14 January 2003 for his first call into the team, when he was an unused substitute during a 2–1 Second Division defeat to Oldham Athletic. He made his senior debut with a start in a 1–0 victory over Luton Town on 22 February 2003 and finished an injury-hit 2002–03 season with seven appearances. Fieldwick signed a new two-year contract in May 2003 and was a regular pick in the squad during the first two months of the 2003–04 season, but managed only five appearances, with four starts and one as a substitute. He had dropped out of the squad entirely by December 2003 and departed on loan for the rest of the season on transfer deadline day in March 2004. Fieldwick was released by manager Martin Allen in late April 2004 and he departed having made just 12 appearances during three seasons as a professional at Griffin Park.

Swansea City (loan) 
On 25 March 2003, Fieldwick joined Third Division club Swansea City on loan until the end of the 2003–04 season. He made five appearances before dropping out of the squad.

Non-league football 
Fieldwick finished his career with a short spell in non-League football, playing for Conference South clubs Lewes, Maidenhead United, St Albans City and Bromley between 2004 and 2007. He later played for Southern Amateur League club West Wickham.

Career statistics

References

External links

Living people
1982 births
Footballers from Croydon
English footballers
Brentford F.C. players
Swansea City A.F.C. players
Lewes F.C. players
Maidenhead United F.C. players
St Albans City F.C. players
Bromley F.C. players
English Football League players
National League (English football) players
Association football fullbacks